This is a list of main career statistics of Slovak professional tennis player Martin Kližan.

ATP career finals

Singles: 7 (6 titles, 1 runner-up)

Doubles: 4 (4 titles)

ATP Challenger and ITF Futures finals

Singles: 20 (11–9)

Doubles: 20 (7–13)

Junior Grand Slam finals

Singles: 1 (1 title)

Doubles: 2 (2 runners-up)

Performance timelines

<small>Davis Cup and World Team Cup matches are included in the statistics. Walkovers are neither official wins nor official losses.</small>Current through the 2021 Wimbledon Championships.''

Singles

1 Held as Hamburg Masters (clay) until 2008, Madrid Masters (clay) 2009–present.	 
2 Held as Madrid Masters (indoor hardcourt) from 2002–08, Shanghai Masters (outdoor hardcourt) 2009–present.

Doubles

Top 10 wins

Klizan, Martin